Alberto Girri (27 November 1919 – 16 November 1991) was an Argentine poet and writer born in Buenos Aires.

Principal works
 Beatrix Cenci. Ópera.
 Juegos alegóricos. 1993.
 Trama de conflictos. 1988.
 Páginas de Alberto Girri. 1983.
 Lírica de percepciones. 1983.
 Lo propio lo de todos. 1980.
 Recluso platónico. 1978
 El motivo es el poema. 1976.
 Quien habla no esta muerto. 1975.
 Penitencia y el mérito. 1957.
 El tiempo que destruye. 1950.
 Trece poemas. 1949.
 Coronación de la espera. 1947.
 Playa sola. 1946.
 Poesía de observación.

1919 births
1991 deaths
20th-century Argentine poets
20th-century Argentine male writers
Argentine male poets
Place of birth missing